Draadstaal ("Wire Steel" or "Rebar") is a Dutch satirical sketch comedy television program produced by CCCP and broadcast by VPRO, a Dutch broadcaster. It was created by CCCP and Jeroen van Koningsbrugge and Dennis van de Ven. The first seasons aired 14 September 2007 to 22 November 2010. After a couple of years it was restarted in 2015 and new episodes are still being made in 2020. The show featured a lot of recurring stereotypical comedy characters.

The program is reminiscent of the work of Dutch comedy duo Van Kooten en De Bie.

References

External links
 Official website

Dutch satirical television shows
Dutch television sketch shows
Dutch comedy television series
2007 Dutch television series debuts
NPO 3 original programming